North Easton station is a proposed railroad station on the MBTA Commuter Rail's South Coast Rail located on the border of North Easton, Massachusetts and Stoughton, Massachusetts. It is proposed to built as part of the state's effort to extend rail service to Fall River and New Bedford. It would be located well to the north of the old station in North Easton, itself to become Easton Village station one stop southwards on the new line to New Bedford and Fall River.

References

Easton, Massachusetts
Proposed MBTA Commuter Rail stations
MBTA Commuter Rail stations in Bristol County, Massachusetts
Railway stations scheduled to open in 2030